Cai Mingmin (born 30 October 2000) is a Chinese footballer currently playing as a midfielder for Guangzhou.

Career statistics

Club
.

References

2000 births
Living people
Sportspeople from Hainan
Chinese footballers
China youth international footballers
Association football midfielders
China League Two players
China League One players
Chinese Super League players
Guangzhou F.C. players
Kunshan F.C. players
21st-century Chinese people